Hague/Guliker Field Aerodrome  was located  north-east of Hague, Saskatchewan, Canada.

See also 
 List of airports in Saskatchewan
 List of defunct airports in Canada

References 

Defunct airports in Saskatchewan
Rosthern No. 403, Saskatchewan